North Shore Animal League America, headquartered in Port Washington, New York, is the largest no-kill animal rescue and adoption organization in the world.  Marianne H. Sanders founded the League in  1944, and the League's mission has been saving the lives of pets through adoption, rescue, spay/neuter and advocacy initiatives. Each year, the League rescues, nurtures and adopts nearly 20,000 pets nationwide, and to date, has placed nearly one million puppies, kittens, cats and dogs into screened homes.  One of the first animal rescue agencies on the ground in the aftermath of Hurricanes Katrina and Rita, the League rescued more than 1,400 pets from the region.

The Alex Lewyt Veterinary Medical Center is on the premises to provide 24-hour care for pets sheltered at the League. 

Every year the medical center takes care of more than 10,000 outpatient visits, administers more than 15,000 vaccinations and performs over 11,000 free spay/neuter procedures for adopted pets, preventing over 132 million unwanted litters. The League's SPAY/USA program is a nationwide referral service for affordable spay/neuter services. The League is also home to a National Shelter Rescue and Humane Education Team. The League has a mobile adoption program, adoption counseling, training and foster care for pets with special needs. 

In 2005, a documentary series titled Animal House: A Dog's Life on the Animal Planet aired 13 episodes about dogs and workers at the League.

References

External links
 
 Charity Navigator's ranking of NSALA

Animal shelters in the United States
Organizations established in 1944
Domestic cat welfare organizations
Charities based in New York (state)

Animal charities based in the United States